Prepayment meter can refer to:

 Electricity meter
 Water meter
 Gas meter
 Parking meter

See also 

 Pay as you go (disambiguation)